Tommy Leahy (5 August 1870 – 14 October 1916) was an  Australian rules footballer who played with Essendon in the Victorian Football League (VFL).

Notes

External links 
		

1870 births
1916 deaths
Australian rules footballers from Victoria (Australia)
Essendon Football Club players